Athos Bartolucci (Ferrara, 28 October 1902 – Framura, 1992) was an Italian Fascist politician and journalist, who served as federal secretary of the National Fascist Party in Dalmatia from 1934 to 1942 and as Civilian Commissioner for occupied Dalmatia during World War II.

Biography

At age seventeen, he participated in Gabriele D'Annunzio's occupation of Fiume and later of Zara.

From 1923 to 1928 he studied Diplomatic and Consular Sciences at the Ca' Foscari University of Venice, becoming head of its Gruppo Universitario Fascista. On 21 May 1934 he was appointed Federal Secretary of the National Fascist Party for Dalmatia (with seat in Zara), a post he held till 29 July 1942.

In 1935-1936 he volunteered in the Royal Italian Air Force during the Second Italo-Ethiopian War, with the rank of Lieutenant, receiving a Bronze Medal of Military Valor for having successfully repelled an ambush against the supply column he was leading near Termaber Pass in May 1936.

In 1939 he became a member of the Chamber of Fasces and Corporations. On 16 April 1941, after the Axis invasion of Yugoslavia, he was appointed Civil Commissioner for occupied Dalmatia by Benito Mussolini; he held this post until 6 June 1941, when the Governatorate of Dalmatia was established, with Giuseppe Bastianini as governor. Bartolucci then became Inspector of the Fascist Party for Dalmatia.

After World War II he was wanted by Yugoslavia for war crimes, but was acquitted of all charges. He continued his career, holding various posts within the Trust Territory of Somaliland, and becoming in 1961 president of the Chamber of Commerce of Somalia.

He died in 1992.

References

1902 births
1992 deaths
Members of the Chamber of Fasces and Corporations
Italian Fascism
National Fascist Party politicians
Recipients of the Bronze Medal of Military Valor